Archibald Campbell Swinton of Kimmerghame FRSE DL LLD (15 July 1812 – 27 November 1889), was a Scottish author, politician and professor of civil law at Edinburgh, 1862–72.

Early life and family
Archibald Campbell Swinton was born the elder son of John Campbell Swinton WS of Kimmerghame, Berwickshire, and Catherine Rannie, his wife, and grandson of Archibald, fourth son of John Swinton of Swinton, Berwickshire, all members of Clan Swinton. His younger brother, James Rannie, became a fashionable portrait artist, and sisters Catherine and Elizabeth, shared an interest in art. His father had law offices and a house at 9 Shandwick Place in Edinburgh's West End, just off Princes Street.

He was educated at the Edinburgh Academy, his classmates including Archibald Campbell Tait, afterwards Archbishop of Canterbury.

Swinton studied law at the University of Glasgow and University of Edinburgh.

Career and Later life
He passed the Scottish bar as an advocate in 1833, and acquired a large legal practice. He initiated an important reform in the system of reporting criminal trials. He lived and worked at 9 Gloucester Place in Edinburgh's Second New Town.

In 1844 he was elected a Fellow of the Royal Society of Edinburgh. His proposer was Thomas Charles Hope. He was then living at 9 Gloucester Place in Edinburgh.

In 1852 he was elected professor of civil law in Edinburgh University, his lectures being largely attended. He resigned the professorship on succeeding in 1872 to the Kimmerghame estate, and devoted himself to political work. He served on various royal commissions, and by his oratorical powers and legal knowledge won a foremost place as a layman in the General Assembly of the Church of Scotland.

He resigned from his chair at Edinburgh University in April 1862 and was replaced by James Muirhead. Swinton was then living at 34 Charlotte Square.

He was an unsuccessful Conservative candidate for the parliamentary constituency of Haddington Burghs in 1852 and of the universities of Edinburgh and St Andrews in 1869.

He died on 27 November 1890.

Family
He married twice: firstly Katherine Margaret Pringle (d.1846), daughter of Sir John Pringle of Stitchell, bart.; and secondly, Georgina Caroline Sitwell, daughter of Sir George Sitwell of Renishaw, bart.

He was father to the electrical engineer Alan Archibald Campbell-Swinton (1863-1930) (normally known as A. A. Campbell-Swinton).

Publications

Besides a lecture on 'Men of the Merse' (privately printed, Edinburgh, 1858, 8vo), Swinton published a family history entitled 'The Swintons of that Ilk and their Cadets' (Edinburgh, 1883, 8vo), which had originally been contributed in 1878 to the 'Proceedings of the Berwickshire Naturalists' Club' (information supplied by the bishop of Winchester; Times, 6 December 1890).

References

Sources
 

1812 births
People educated at Edinburgh Academy
Alumni of the University of Glasgow
Alumni of the University of Edinburgh
1890 deaths
Members of the Faculty of Advocates
Academics of the University of Glasgow
19th-century Scottish writers
Scottish politicians